Košarkaški klub Hermes Analitica (English: Hermes Analitica Basketball Club), commonly referred to as KK Hermes Analitica or simply Hermes Analitica, is a men's professional basketball club based in Zagreb, Croatia. The club competes in the Croatian League.

The club is sponsored and was founded by the medical and pharmaceutical equipment company of the same name.

External links 
Official website (in Croatian)
HKS (in Croatian)
Eurobasket
FIBA

Basketball teams in Croatia
Basketball teams established in 1997